Subilsia senenti is a species of beetle in the family Carabidae, the only species in the genus Subilsia.

References

Trechinae